"My Own Worst Enemy" is a song by the American rock band Lit. It was commercially released in June 1999 as the lead single from Lit's second album, A Place in the Sun, which was also released that year. The song was only moderately successful at first, reaching number 17 on the Modern Rock Tracks chart on February 27, 1999. It later achieved mainstream success, peaking at number 51 on the Billboard Hot 100 chart and number one on the Modern Rock Tracks (also known as Alternative Songs) chart. The song's success helped A Place in the Sun to be certified platinum by the Recording Industry Association of America (RIAA) on October 27, 1999, for sales of 1,300,000 copies in the United States. At the 1999 Billboard Music Awards, "My Own Worst Enemy" won the Modern Rock Track of the Year award. Its music video was filmed by Gavin Bowden in a Long Beach bowling alley. That alley was Java Lanes on P.C.H. It was inside the Famous Tiki Bar which was the home of DiPiazza's Restaurant.

Considered pop punk, power pop and alternative rock, "My Own Worst Enemy" is, according to Lit guitarist Jeremy Popoff,  "the result of waking up and realizing you screwed up the night before". Vocalist A. Jay Popoff said that the song "was the combination of many, many incidents"; he had gotten in trouble with the law for public nudity in the late 1990s, and sang "My Own Worst Enemy" nude in the studio. Popoff described a New Year's when the band got drunk in Laughlin, Nevada; he stole a janitor's cart, and he "and five friends jumped onto the flatbed, rode down the sidewalk, and got chased by the cops".

Background and recording
According to Lit guitarist Jeremy Popoff, "My Own Worst Enemy" "is the result of waking up and realizing you screwed up the night before. The first verse is about screwing up with your chick. A. Jay's the king of having four ex-girlfriends show up to the same show. It's funny watching him try to juggle". Vocalist A. Jay Popoff said that the song "was the combination of many, many incidents ... Sometimes I get in trouble when I get naked in public and have a girl there. It happens when I've been drinking Jägermeister. I actually sang 'My Own Worst Enemy' naked in the studio". The singer said that the song's second verse "is about the morning after, when you hear about all the lame shit you did ... The last time it happened was when we got really drunk in Laughlin, Nevada, for New Year's. I stole a janitor cart, and me and five friends jumped onto the flatbed, rode down the sidewalk, and got chased by the cops. The next day, I found a couple of my friends were taken in by security, who were searching for me all night. I was tucked away in my hotel room, oblivious."

Composition
Considered a pop punk, and power pop and alternative rock song, "My Own Worst Enemy" is composed in the key of E major with a tempo of 104 beats per minute. A. Jay's voice ranges from E3 to G#4. "My Own Worst Enemy" has been incorrectly attributed to Blink-182, and its title misquoted as "Please Tell Me Why". The song is known for its guitar riff.

Critical reception
James Oldham of NME called "My Own Worst Enemy" "totally loathsome, poisonous stuff, but quite addictive." The song was a late inclusion on NME "20 Essential Pop Punk Tracks Everyone Should Know" list. It was featured on Fuse's "14 Best Pop-Punk One-Hit Wonders", and the channel called the song "self-deprecating and catchy". "My Own Worst Enemy" appeared on the Phoenix New Times "10 Best Pop-Punk Songs of All Time" list. Daniel J. Katz of The Tech criticized the song's parent album: "Recipe for a one-hit wonder: Start with Eve 6/Harvey Danger style power pop that’s already been done to death. Turn the guitars way up and turn the creativity way down. What you’re left with is a weak collection of songs that are listenable, but bland. This particular collection is from a band called Lit, and it’s called A Place In The Sun (RCA)." Katz continued, "The aforementioned one hit on the album is 'My Own Worst Enemy. A week earlier, Katz wrote that "My Own Worst Enemy" "is a great song because of its simplicity and short duration". According to Liz Tracy of the New Times Broward-Palm Beach, My Own Worst Enemy' was so incredibly radio-friendly that it was hard not to get sucked into that punchy tune and sort of pathetic lyrics".

Fuse said, My Own Worst Enemy' is self-deprecating and catchy, like all good sad boy band music. The opening line, 'Can we forget about the things I said when I was drunk? / I didn't mean to call you that' might be the most pop-punk verse ever written". Lit appeared on Fuse's "Spin 14 of Pop-Punk's Best One-Hit Wonders" list. Consequence of Sound included Lit on its "100 Best Pop Punk Bands" list, calling "My Own Worst Enemy" the band's essential track. Zack Ruskin of Consequence of Sound called the song "an anthemic earworm". Spectrum Culture placed "My Own Worst Enemy" sixth on its "Top 10 Pop Punk and Power Pop Songs of the Modern Era" list. According to Spectrum Culture, with "My Own Worst Enemy" Lit "demonstrates the adolescent fallouts that can occur from a post-high school life". In CMJ New Music Report review of A Place in the Sun, "My Own Worst Enemy" was on its recommended-tracks list. Becky Kirsch of PopSugar called the song an "awesome '90s" hit.

Commercial performance
On February 27, 1999, "My Own Worst Enemy" reached number 17 on the Modern Rock Tracks (also known as Alternative Songs) chart. The song later achieved mainstream success. On April 10, "My Own Worst Enemy" topped the Modern Rock Tracks chart. On May 29, the song peaked at number six on the Mainstream Rock chart. On July 3, it peaked at number 51 on the Billboard Hot 100 chart and at number 45 on the Radio Songs chart. The song was on both charts for 20 weeks. On July 17, "My Own Worst Enemy" peaked at number 31 on the Mainstream Top 40 chart. On August 21 the song peaked at number 30 on the Adult Pop Songs chart, spending 26 weeks there. A Place in the Sun, its parent album, was certified gold by the Recording Industry Association of America (RIAA) on June 21, 1999, and platinum on October 27 for sales of 1,300,000 copies in the United States. The album was certified gold by Music Canada in December 1999. Lit performed "My Own Worst Enemy" at Woodstock '99. The song received the Modern Rock Track of the Year award at the 1999 Billboard Music Awards. The song topped the Year-End Modern Rock Tracks chart and was number 18 on the Year-End Mainstream Rock chart. Lit was number four on the Year-End Hot Modern Rock Artists chart.

Music video
The song's music video was filmed by Gavin Bowden at Java Lanes bowling alley in Long Beach.

Track listings and formats
European CD single and UK 7-inch single
 "My Own Worst Enemy" – 2:58
 "Bitter" – 3:30

UK cassette single
 "My Own Worst Enemy" (clean version) – 2:58
 "Bitter" – 3:30

European maxi-CD and Australian CD single
 "My Own Worst Enemy" – 2:58
 "Money" – 2:58
 "Lovely Day" – 4:06

Charts

Weekly charts

Year-end charts

Certifications

Release history

In popular culture
"My Own Worst Enemy" is heard in the 2000 film Ready to Rumble and 2012 film American Reunion, although the song does not appear on the original soundtracks of either movie. It was featured on Parks and Recreation, with some of the show's characters playing the song on Rock Band 2. "My Own Worst Enemy" was used in the 2016 action comedy Central Intelligence, and the PEN15 episode "First Day". The song was popular among fans of the Detroit Red Wings hockey team during games at the Joe Louis Arena. During penalty face-offs, it would play before cutting off at the chorus, to which the fans would sing the rest of the chorus.

On May 27, 2022, Clay Travis and Buck Sexton announced that "My Own Worst Enemy" would become the theme song to their talk radio program, The Clay Travis & Buck Sexton Show. Previously, the show had used The Pretenders' "My City Was Gone", which had long been the theme to Travis and Sexton's predecessor program, The Rush Limbaugh Show, but the syndicators' rights to the latter song were soon to expire.

References

1999 singles
1999 songs
American pop punk songs
American power pop songs
Lit (band) songs
RCA Records singles
Songs about alcohol